Lambertiodes multipunctata is a moth of the family Tortricidae. It is found in China.

The wingspan is 27.5-29.5 mm for males and 31.5 mm for females. The forewing ground colour is pale yellow, with a number of scattered dark brown dots. The hindwings are pale grey, but slightly yellowish at the apex.

Etymology
The specific name is derived from the Latin prefix multi- (meaning numerous) and punctatus (meaning punctuate) and refers to the many dark brown dots on the forewing.

References

Moths described in 2007
Sparganothini